Michael Eggert (born 29 September 1952) is a retired German footballer.

References

External links
 

1952 births
Living people
German footballers
Germany B international footballers
Bundesliga players
VfL Bochum players
1. FC Nürnberg players
[
Association football midfielders